Daniel Rosin (born 18 May 1980 in Freital, East Germany) is a German footballer.

Rosin had a trial with Rangers in 2002, but did not impress the manager during this time.

References

External links 
 

1980 births
Living people
People from Freital
People from Bezirk Dresden
German footballers
Footballers from Saxony
Association football defenders
Dynamo Dresden II players
FC Bayern Munich II players
Alemannia Aachen players
SV Wacker Burghausen players
1. FC Magdeburg players
RB Leipzig players
2. Bundesliga players